White Scar Caves is a show cave in the civil parish of Ingleton, North Yorkshire, England, under Ingleborough in the Chapel-le-Dale valley of the Yorkshire Dales National Park.

Originally accessed through a vertical boulder choke, an access tunnel has been cut to include it on the visitor trail.

It is open as a show cave, the entrance being from the Ribblehead to Ingleton road on the west of Ingleborough, with tours being run throughout the year. The visitor facilities include a shop and café.

References

External links
Visitor attraction website

Show caves in the United Kingdom
Yorkshire Dales
Caves of North Yorkshire
Subterranean waterfalls